Sarojini Nagar is one of the 403 assembly constituencies of the Uttar Pradesh Legislative Assembly covering the area of Sarojini Nagar in the Lucknow district. It is one of five assembly constituencies in the Mohanlalganj Lok Sabha constituency.

Since 2008, this assembly constituency is numbered 170 amongst 403 constituencies.

In 2022 Uttar Pradesh Legislative Assembly elections, Bharatiya Janata Party (BJP) candidate Rajeshwar Singh won the elections defeating Samajwadi Party candidate Abhishek Mishra by the margin of 56,186 votes. He is an ex-ED Joint Director IPS officer who has taken VRS from the service to contest the elections.

Members of Legislative Assembly

Election results

2022

2017

2012

2007

References

External links
 

Assembly constituencies of Uttar Pradesh